Ciprian Cezar Tudorascu (born 17 August 1979) is a Romanian football coach, currently hold UEFA "A" Coaching Licence, best known for promoting quality football players for national teams from different countries including Raheem Edwards, Romario Benzar, Gabriel Torje, Cristian Daminuta, Silviu Balaure, Dorin Rotariu and many others young talented players who play at this moment in professional teams around the world.

Early life and education 
He holds a bachelor's Degree in sports science obtained at West University of Timișoara and he obtained his "B" UEFA license in 2004, and his "A" UEFA license in 2007 to the Romanian Football Federation, and he updated his UEFA certificate in 2014 in Italy at the Italian Football Federation.

Playing career
Born in Timișoara, Tudorascu played at youth level for FC Politehnica Timișoara, FC CFR Timișoara, before persistent knee injuries ended his career at 20 years old in third national league playing for ASU Politehnica Timișoara.

Coaching career 
In August 2000 he was appointed coach of FC Srbianka Giuchici Timișoara, one of the best private football schools from West of Romania at the time. In 2005, he moved to Italy and he became the coach of ASDC Fiume Veneto Bannia -Pordenone Calcio (Under 10 and 15 youth teams), the second Romanian coach in Italy at all levels, after the legendary Mircea Lucescu. The Italian mass media call him "successor of Lucescu". In June 2009, Tudorascu returned to his hometown and signed a deal to become the new coach to the Under 14 team at FC Timișoara Academy (ex FC Politehnica Timișoara), in maybe the most glorious period of the club. In August 2011 he finished the contract with FC Timișoara, and immediately started a collaboration with Ernesto Nani, inside the Italian football project "Nuove Frontiere" and in the same time he started a technical collaboration with the Soccer Elite Football Academy from United Kingdom (affiliated Chelsea FC) and he is one of the founders of International Football School at Timișoara. In 2012 receive the opportunity to be part of one of the best youth academies from Germany, VFB Stuttgart. In the summer of 2013, he was appointed Head of Youth Development and Head coach to Atalanta Bergamasca FC (Academy of Atalanta in South Italy- Katane Soccer). After four glorious years, he moves to another continent to give his contribution to the development of football in Asia, signing with Shanghai JuJu Sports F.C.
Due to the COVID-19 pandemic, the Chinese club suspended its contract in 2020. 
Starting with October 2021, the experienced coach/manager accepted a new offer from Middle East and he became the new Academy Manager at Winners Football Club who's operating in Bahrain and Saudi Arabia.
His impressive journey continues far from his comfort zone, where he'll certainly leave his mark.

Management style and influence 
Mister Tudorascu believes in the Dutch concept of Total Football, insisting that young players should be coached in all aspects of football rather than into specialist positions, helping the team both with or without the ball. It is a system where a player who moves out of his position is replaced by another from his team, thus allowing the team to retain its intended organizational structure. In this fluid system, no footballer is fixed in their intended outfield role. He is also a big fan of 2012 of the new Belgian Football philosophy, which influenced him from that moment. During his coaching career, Mister Tudorascu participate in various activities to important clubs from Europe: Red Star Belgrade, Udinese FC Calcio, Chelsea FC, and Vfb Stuttgart.
His favorite football system is an offensive 1-4-3-3, balanced and very elastic. He is considered by the Italian newspaper Il Gazzettino one of the best football coaches from Europe for young adults, for his methods to manage and lead the teams in and out of the field.

External links
 Ciprian Cezar Tudorascu Official Website

References 

 Italy doesn't forget Mister Cezar (Italian)
 Interview for Eurosport 2020 (Romanian)
 Coach Tudorascu about his ex-player Benzar Romario (Romanian)
 Mister Tudorascu torna in Italia (Italian)
 Torneo Franco Gallini Italia (Italian)
 Coach Ciprian Cezar left FC Timisoara (Romanian)
 Coach Tudorascu,the end of story with FC Timisoara (Romanian)
 Mister Ciprian Cezar Tudorascu and the collaboration with Mister Ernesto Nani (Italian)
 Ciprian Tudorascu and his ex-player Benzar Romario (Romanian)
 Ciprian Cezar Tudorascu,ready for Canada experience! (Romanian)
 Scoala de Fotbal International on TV  Romanian)

1979 births
Living people
Romanian football managers
Sportspeople from Timișoara
West University of Timișoara alumni